Sandra Sopuluchukwu Ezekwesili is a Nigerian broadcast journalist, and media personality. She currently hosts the drive time News and Current  Affairs radio show, "Hard Facts" on Nigeria Info 99.3FM in Lagos, Nigeria.

Early life and career

Born in Port Harcourt, Sandra is from Nara-Unateze, Nkanu-East Local Government Area, Nigeria. Sandra spent the first seven years of her life in Enugu where she attended NAOWA Nursery and Primary School Enugu. In 1997, she moved with her family to Port Harcourt, when the Nigeria Bottling Company moved her father there.

While living in Port Harcourt, she attended Holy Rosary College, a boarding school in Enugu. She later attended Enugu State University of Science and Technology, where she received a Bachelor's degree in Mass Communication,

While at University, there was a long lecturer's strike. During this free time, she got an intern at the Enugu State Broadcasting Service (ESBS). Although the internship was intended to cover only production assistant duties, she impressed the management enough to give her an opportunity to be a presenter. It went so well that when she left the station at the end of the strike, the Head of Station at ESBS asked her to come back after she got her degree.

After graduation, she went on to work for Katsina State TV during her Service Year, before moving back south to work for Radio Bayelsa and Ray Power FM Yenogoa.

Cool FM

Sandra came to the attention of Cool FM Port Harcourt when she recorded an audition tape on her smartphone.  She was invited to audition properly and was hired in March 2013.

She quickly became a popular on-air personality winning or being nominated for a variety of awards in her first year at Cool FM. These include the Female On-Air Personality of the Year in August 2014 by Ohanaeze Ndi Igbo. She was also given an award by the Stefano Piotti Foundation in 2015.

Nigeria Info

In November 2018, Sandra moved from Cool FM Port Harcourt to its sister station in, Nigeria Info 99.3FM Lagos, a news and current affairs talk radio station. She became the host of "Hard Facts", the station's evening drive time (3pm to 7pm) talk program. This show is currently rated No 2 in its time slot.

Other Activities

Sandra is an accomplished events host and MC. She is also a Public Speaker and gave a TedxYouth talk in 2014.

Following the sexual assault of one of the participants while she slept by another participant on Big Brother Nigeria, Sandra has become a fierce advocate for Consent Education in Nigeria and a growing voice against sexual harassment

References 

Living people
1989 births
Enugu State University of Science and Technology alumni
Radio personalities from Port Harcourt
Nigerian infotainers
Nigerian radio presenters
Nigerian women radio presenters
Nigerian radio journalists
Nigerian women journalists
Women radio journalists